Mammillaria sanchez-mejoradae is a species of plant in the family Cactaceae. It is endemic to Nuevo León state of northeastern Mexico. Its natural habitat is hot deserts. It is a Critically endangered species, threatened by habitat loss.

References

sanchez-mejoradae
Cacti of Mexico
Endemic flora of Mexico
Flora of Nuevo León
Critically endangered plants
Endangered biota of Mexico
Taxonomy articles created by Polbot
Plants described in 1992